Harpalus progrediens is a species of ground beetle in the subfamily Harpalinae. It was described by Schauberger in 1992.

References

progrediens
Beetles described in 1992